Ashley Horace Thorndike (1871 – April 17, 1933) was an American educator and expert on William Shakespeare. He was the son of a clergyman Edward R Thorndike, and the brother of Lynn Thorndike, an American historian of medieval science and alchemy, and Edward Lee Thorndike known for being the father of modern educational psychology.

He taught at Columbia University and wrote several notable textbooks, including Facts about Shakespeare (as coauthor), Tragedy, and English Comedy. He died of a heart attack in Manhattan as he was walking home from a club dinner. He was the brother of the medieval historian Lynn Thorndike. He introduced the term "revenge tragedy" in 1900 to label a class of plays written in the late Elizabethan and early Jacobean eras.

In 1927 he delivered the British Academy's Shakespeare Lecture.

Selected publications
 The Influence of Beaumont and Fletcher on Shakespere (1901)
 The Elements of Shakespeare and Composition (1905)
 Tragedy (1908)
 with William Allan Neilson: The Facts about Shakespeare (1913); 1923 reprint
 Shakespeare's Theatre (1916)
 Literature in a Changing World (1920)
 English Comedy (1929); 1965 edition

References

Staff report (April 18, 1933) Dr. A.H. Thorndike Dies in a Taxicab; World Famous as Shakespearean Scholar. The New York Times

External links
 
 
Finding aid to Ashley Horace Thorndike papers at Columbia University. Rare Book & Manuscript Library.

1871 births
1933 deaths
Shakespearean scholars
Presidents of the Modern Language Association